Roman Linscheid is an Irish Olympic hammer thrower. He represented his country at the 1996 Summer Olympics. His best toss in those Olympics was a 68.14, while his personal best, set in 1999, was a 76.25. He is the brother of fellow Olympian Simon Linscheid, and competed domestically for Donore Harriers.

References

1970 births
Living people
Irish male hammer throwers
Olympic athletes of Ireland
Athletes (track and field) at the 1996 Summer Olympics